The 1996 Individual Ice Speedway World Championship was the 31st edition of the World Championship  The Championship was held as a Grand Prix series over ten rounds. 

Alexander Balashov of Russia won his second World title.

Classification

See also 
 1996 Speedway Grand Prix in classic speedway
 1996 Team Ice Racing World Championship

References 

Ice speedway competitions
World